Besselvassheia is a mountain in the municipality of Frøya in Trøndelag county, Norway.

Name
The mountain was unnamed until the autumn of 2009 when it was given the name Besselvassheia, after the nearby lake Besselvatnet.

The well-known Norwegian Soccer trainer Drillo, also known for his interest in geography, told a local resident, Frank Angelvik, that the highest point of Frøya was unnamed. Together with Halgeir Hammer, a local guide, the naming contest was announced in September 2009.  Some of the names that were runners-up were: Frøyberget, Frøytuva, Halgeirtoppen, Halgeirguten, and Besselberget.

References

External links
Besselvassheia...nå høyeste punkt 

Mountains of Trøndelag
Frøya, Trøndelag